The Adventures of the Little Prince may refer to:

The Little Prince, French aviator Antoine de Saint Exupéry's most famous novella
The Adventures of the Little Prince (TV series), anime series based on the book by Antoine de Saint-Exupéry

Antoine de Saint-Exupéry